Patrick 'Pat' Petersen (December 3, 1959 – May 31, 2015) was an American long-distance runner who once held the American record for the marathon, when he ran 2:10:04 at the 1989 London Marathon It was a record that stood for 9 years, until it was finally broken in 1999 by Khalid Khannouchi's world-record run of 2:05:42 in that year's Chicago Marathon. .

Running career

High school
Petersen attended Islip High School until he graduated in 1978. He competed in cross country and track in high school, and was described as a competitive runner but had no extraordinary results as a high-schooler. From his earliest years of running he was identified as having an unusual running form.

Collegiate
Petersen first attended Farmingdale State College for two years, and then transferred to Manhattan College, where he graduated in 1981. At the time, Manhattan College had one of the most competitive collegiate distance running programs in the United States, and when Petersen transferred, the team had Bill Krohn.

Post-collegiate
Petersen initially intended on quitting running after college, but was offered a part-time position at Super Runners shop in Long Island, which was owned by the winner of the 1970 New York City Marathon, Gary Muhrcke. He ran for Warren Street Social and for a time was sponsored by Adidas. In 1991 he collapsed in the middle of a workout in Central Park and was subsequently diagnosed with a heart irregularity, which ultimately ended his competitive running career. He married Bea Huste-Petersen, also a marathoner, and had four children. They both started a foundation for autism called the EJ Autism Foundation.

Achievements

Source: Association of Road Racing Statisticians (ARRS) profile: Pat Petersen.

References

1959 births
2015 deaths
American male long-distance runners
American male marathon runners
People from Nassau County, New York
Track and field athletes from New York (state)
Manhattan Jaspers track and field athletes
Farmingdale State Rams men's track and field athletes